David Leadbetter (born 27 June 1952) is a leading golf instructor, originally from Worthing in Sussex, England.

Career
Leadbetter began his career on the European and Southern African tours, but had little success as a player. Having an interest in the techniques, mechanics and psychology of the sport, he soon moved into instruction and came to wide notice in the 1980s when he rebuilt the swing of Nick Faldo, who then went on to win six major championships.

Leadbetter now runs an international chain of golf academies headquartered at the ChampionsGate Golf Club in Davenport, Florida, U.S. which has 36 holes designed by Greg Norman. There are also branches elsewhere in North America and in Europe, Asia, and Africa. Since launching the first Leadbetter Golf Academy over 30 years ago, David has coached players to 26 Major Championship titles and over 150 individual worldwide tournament victories. Seven of those players have even held first place in the Official World Golf Ranking.

Leadbetter himself concentrates on teaching tour professionals and on instructing other coaches in his methods, who then teach his ideas at his academies. Apart from Faldo his students include Nick Price, Charles Howell III, Michelle Wie, Lydia Ko and Byeong Hun An. Pros who formerly worked with Leadbetter included: Nick Faldo (1984–1998), Greg Norman (1997), and Ernie Els (1990–2008). He was ranked second to Butch Harmon on the 2005-2006 edition of Golf Digest's list of the "50 Greatest Teachers" in the United States.

Throughout his career, Leadbetter has also written eight books about golf swings.  He has also overseen the development of various golf training media, products and services, including the SwingSetter, SwingSetter Pro and a number of A Swing approved training aids released with the book.  His books have sold two million copies making him one of the best-selling golf instruction authors in the world.

Trained champions
The following golfers whom Leadbetter coached went on to win the following tournaments:
Kathy Baker - 1985 U.S. Women’s Open
Ian Baker-Finch - 1991 Open Championship
Ernie Els - 1994, 1997 U.S. Open, 2002, 2012 Open Championship
Nick Faldo - 1989, 1990, 1996 Masters, 1987, 1990, 1992 Open Championship
Trevor Immelman - 2008 Masters
Danielle Kang - 2017 Women’s PGA Championship
Lydia Ko - 2015 Evian Championship, 2016 ANA Inspiration Championship, 2015, 2016 Best Female Golfer, 2014 LPGA Rookie of the Year, 2015 LPGA Player of the Year
Se Ri Pak - 1998 U.S. Women’s Open, 1998 LPGA Rookie of the Year, 2007 World Golf Hall of Fame
Suzann Pettersen - 2006 Women's PGA Championship, 2013 Evian Championship
Nick Price - 1992, 1994 PGA Championships, 1994 Open Championship, 1993, 1994 PGA Tour Player of the Year, 2003 World Golf Hall of Fame
Michelle Wie - 2014 U.S. Women’s Open
Josh Dockum - General Manager/Director of Golf/Head Golf Professional/Whole Staff - Pin Oak Links - Manchester, IA

Criticism of Tiger Woods
In February 1997, it was reported that Leadbetter criticized famous American golfer Tiger Woods, saying "Right now, Tiger is a one-dimensional player who swings full on practically every shot.....Another thing that will prevent Tiger from winning a major is pressure. There’s a big difference between winning at Las Vegas and winning at Augusta… He has to pay his dues." - - Tiger went on to win the Masters 2 months later by twelve strokes.  More than two decades later, in December 2017, he questioned the hunger of the top male pros due to the money involved in golf now and also the media frenzy that follows Tiger Woods everywhere.

Products and media appearances

Leadbetter Kids Golf 
Leadbetter Kids classes teach children ages 3–12 physical, mental, and social skills through combined activity stations of golf fundamentals, basic English skills, and other important Life Skills training and learning, all in a fun and safe environment. Leadbetter Kids is an “experiential learning” environment where children learn subconsciously by replicating real-life situations and interactions with other children and adults.

Leadbetter Golf University 
The Leadbetter Golf University was launched in 2019 with the goal of being the first online platform to encompass every aspect of golf instruction. This digital offering provides instructors with a pathway to further their education and development through micro and specialized courses recognized by the PGA of America. Segmented into four categories (mental, physical, technical, juniors), featured courses include:

 My Evolution of the Golf Swing by David Leadbetter
 Applied Biomechanics by JJ Rivet
 The Only Way to Win by Jim Loehr
 Els for Autism Coaching Program by Ernie Els
 Youth Development – A Champions Athlete by Leadbetter Golf Academy staff

Golfzon Leadbetter 

A new era for Leadbetter began in 2018 through a strategic acquisition from Korean golf technology giant Golfzon Newdin Holdings. Together Leadbetter and Golfzon have the goal of making it simpler and more accessible for golfers to improve and enjoy the sport at every level.  GOLFZON has been named “Best Simulator” by Golf Digest Editors’ Choice Awards from 2017 – 2019. With the largest industry market share, more than 57 million rounds are played on GOLFZON simulators in 46 countries annually across 5,000 global sites. GOLFZON Live Festival (GLF) is a unique online service that provides all users worldwide the chance to participate in global simulator tournaments. In addition, GOLFZON’s cutting-edge sensor technology is internationally recognized as the official training systems of the National Golf Teams of China, Korea and Taiwan.

Video games
Leadbetter appeared in the 1992 video game David Leadbetter's Greens, a MS-DOS port of MicroProse Golf.  He also appeared in the Wii-exclusive My Personal Golf Trainer, released in the fall of 2010.  Trainer is distinguished from other golf games on the platform by requiring the use of the Wii MotionPlus, while also supporting the Wii Balance Board, taking complete advantage of the Wii's motion controls and accessories to provide authentic golf training.

Personal life
Leadbetter and his wife, Kelly (an LPGA Tour professional), their sons Andy and James and their daughter Hally, live in Sarasota, Florida. He is also an endorser/spokesman for SAP, Callaway, Rolex, and Golf Pride grips.

References

External links 
David Leadbetter official site
David Leadbetter Golf Academies official site - in English, French, German and Spanish
Leadbetter Golf University

American golf instructors
British golf instructors
English male golfers
Golf writers and broadcasters
1952 births
Living people
Sportspeople from Worthing
People from Sarasota, Florida